Kuchaman City is a City Located In  Urban Area It Comes Under Didwana-Kuchaman district in the Indian state of Rajasthan. The city includes a few Havelis in the Shekhawati style and a fort overlooking the city. Fresco paintings there depict flowers, motifs, and Hindu mythology.

The local fort is a major tourist attraction and is also part of the route of Palace on Wheels. A few havelis have also opened their doors to the foreign guests, who visit during the winter.

In 2006, part of the Bollywood movie Drona, starring Abhishek Bachchan was shot at Kuchaman Fort.
 
In 2008, part of the movie Jodha-Akbar starring Hrithik Roshan and Ashwarya Rai was shot at Kuchaman Fort.

Demographics
 India census, Kuchaman City had a population of 81969. Males constituted 51% of the population and females 49%. According to the India Census 2011, Kuchaman City had an average literacy rate of 76.53%, significantly higher than the state average of 66.11% and national average of 74.04%; male literacy was 86.82%, and female literacy was 65.65%; 14.46% of the population was under 6 years of age.

Kuchaman City is a well developed city. There are 45 Wards in Kuchaman City. It is situated on the Jaipur Nagaur route. The main businesses in the town are salt-processing, vegetable-oil production and local trade. There are many social societies active in the town, such as Kuchaman Vikas Samiti, the Lions Club, the Rotary Club, Narayan Sewa Sansthan, Maulana Azad Educational Society, Madarsa Islamiya Society, and Mahaveer International. Kuchaman City's educational system is fairly developed, and during the last few years, students from other parts of the state have been coming to the city for education. Kuchaman City is one of those towns in Kuchaman City District to have CCTV cameras installed for security reason thus making it a safest city in Kuchaman City District.

Events 
Kuchaman, being a culturally diverse and fervent society, celebrates various holidays and festivals. Local religious festivals include the Hindu festivals of Ganagaur festival, Janmasthmi Utsav (Shri Blaji Navyuvak Mandal seva sansthan-New Colony) Ganesh Chaturthi Mela-Ganesh Dungri, Navratri Mahotsav - Balak Young Society, Holi-Kavi Sammelan, Dussehra-Kuchaman Stadium, Islamic festivals of Eid ul-Fitr, Eid al-Adha, Shab-e-Barat and other events like the Kuchaman Marathon, Mahaveer Jayanti, Shree Devnarayan Chauhan festival, Harayali Amavasya Mela-Bhairav Talaab, Pashu Mela-Bhairav Talaab, Kuchaman Tade Fair-Station Road are observed throughout the town.

Kuchamani Khyal

Khayal is an all-night recital of the historic and Pauranic love-stories sung and enacted in the villages and small towns. Late Lachhi Ram Ji of Kuchaman was the father of this art form, and had a strong and effective voice. Around a 100 years ago he established this form for the village Kuchaman and thus it came to be known popularly as Kuchamani khyal. Initially the performance was accompanied by Dholak, Nagara, Turri etc. but over the years Harmonium, Tabla Sitar and Sarangi also got played. The symbolic costumes  for example, the king doesn't wear expensive clothes but puts on a crown or a kalangi over his regular clothes. By wearing a lehnga, kurti and kaanchali, and drawing a goonghat a man represents a woman. Pt. Ugamraj ji has contributed immensely in this folk form for the past 65 years, staging the message of patriotism, bravery and truth, in every nook and corner of the country. He has created a world record by staging more than 20000 performances of Kuchamani form of Khayal from Kashmir to Kanyakumari.

Education Centers

Kuchaman is known as 'Shiksha Nagri' (Education Hub) of Nagaur. There are various Colleges, B.Ed. Colleges, ITI, Schools, Coaching Centers, Hostels and private library facilities and other educational institutions in Kuchaman City where students from all over Rajasthan come to pursue their education.
Some of the educational institutes from above categories are

Colleges 
 Adarsh College
 Astha Mahavidhyalaya
 B.R.Khokhar Memorial Teacher Training College
 B.R.Khokhar Memorial BSTC College
 B.R.Khokhar Memorial Integrated College
 Bright Minds Mahavidyalaya
 Career Point Mahavidhyalaya
 D.R. Memorial Mahila Mahavidyalaya
 H.P. Kabra College of Computer Science
 H.P. Kabra Girls College
 Jupiter College
 Kuchaman College
 Marwar Mahavidyalaya
 Marwar Mahila Mahavidyalaya
 Mayur Mahavidyalaya
 Modern Mahila Mahavidyalaya
 Rajeev Gandhi Mahavidyalaya
 Shree Narayan Mahavidyalaya
 Tagore College
 Vivekanand Mahavidhyalaya

Schools 
 Jawahar Navodaya Vidhayala Kuchaman City
 Shivam Vidya Mandir Secondary School, Badla ka bas, Kuchaman City
 GSV Institute
 GSV Senior Secondary School
 Appollo Children Academy
 Nobel Senior Secondary School
 Tagore Shikshan Sansthan Sr. Sec School
 Tagore Science School, Jusri Road Kuchaman City
 B.R.Khokhar Memorial Sr.Sec. School
 Saint Paul's School
 Saint Anselm's School
 Tagore International School
 Vidhya Bharti Public Sr. Sec. School
 Humming Birds School
 Eklavya academy
 Kucha-E-Aman School
 Hi-Tech School
 KCP School
 Sanskar International School
 Nalanda School
 Apollo Children Academy
 VT Sr. Sec. School,
 Vikas Vidhya Mandir
 Rama Memorial School
 Lal Bahadur Shastri Science School
 BR Khokhar Memorial School
 New Modern School
 Aielian Public school
 D.A.V. Classes & Academy
 Geetanjali public sen sec school
 Bharti Children Care School
Kautilya central school
Apex Children Academy
Adarsh International School
allen 
 Ravindra Nath Tagore Senior Secondary School
 Shri karni senior secondary school
 Radhey public school
 Diomand public school
PRC Kota education

Kuchaman city is also having large number of Defence academies in Rajasthan, almost 200.

Kuchaman Vikas Samiti
Kuchaman Vikas Samiti (KVS), established in 1978, runs a number of public service institutions in Kuchaman City. Institutions run by Kuchaman Vikas Samiti include:

 Adarsh Bal Mandir 
 Vikas Vidya Mandir (defunct) 
 Kuchaman College
 B.R. Kabra Mahila Shikshak Prashikshan Mahavidhyalaya
 B.K. Birla Industrial Training Center
  K.V.S. public School
 Sarala Birla Kalyan Mandapam
 Basant Kumar Birla Baarat Bhavan
 Bombay Hall - The auditorium
 Ram Jivan Kabra Rog Nidan Kendra
 Homiyopaithi Hospital
 Kuchaman Library

Transport
 is well connected by rail Kuchaman City railway station and road to other parts of country. Kuchaman enjoys central location in Rajasthan. Kuchaman can be conveniently reached from any part of India by road. The town is situated between the Jaipur, Ajmer & Nagaur, both the towns are situated within  radius with Kuchaman being centrally located. The bypass highway from Jaipur to Nagaur, Kuchaman to Kotputli and Kishangarh to Hanumangarh is going from the Kuchaman city. All of three highways connect the city to the states Haryana and Punjab.
Kuchaman has an international standard central bus terminal that connects to major cities in India along with this, the railway station located here provides Kuchaman residents access to all the major railway routes of India.

Sports 
The only stadium in the city, Kuchaman Nagar Parishad Kharda Multipurpose Stadium, has a seating capacity of 0l5,000 and has hosted District level cricket matches and other sporting events. Kalyan chand mantri Indoor Stadium,Kuchaman College athlete track are the other sporting arenas in the city.
Common games and sports in Kuchaman include athletics, cricket, basketball, badminton, field hockey, football, tennis, kabaddi, kho-kho and chess. The Kharda Stadium in city is the multipurpose sports venue for sports. The Kuchaman Cricket Club (KCC) is one of several cricket clubs of the Nagaur District. KCC organises the Kuchaman Premier League, a district level cricket League. Kuchaman has also a basketball courts at the college ground of Kuchaman College.
In the State budget passed by the Government of Rajasthan in 2022, the announcement was made for another multi-sports stadium called the Major Dhyan Chand Sports Complex in Kuchaman. This is the second sports ground being built in Kuchaman which is still under construction (as in February 2023). The state-of-the-art facilities are being developed for many indoor and outdoor games in this new ground.

Kuchaman Marathon 
The Kuchaman Marathon has been held since 2011. The event has a special theme every year; it is not only about sports but has a social message with a Green Kuchaman-Clean Kuchaman. Kuchaman Marathon is sequenced to make Kuchaman a high-class city and prove its existence on the global map. The Kuchaman Marathon organises every year in the month of February with a cause. Some of the themes namely :

 Run for Clean City, Green City.
 Run for No Use of Plastic.
 Run for Fun & Fitness which created a sports culture.
 Run for Fight against Child Labour.
 Run against Cancer and AIDS.
 Run for Blood Donation.
 Run for Mother - Save the girl Child.
 Run for Social Support.
 Run for Flood affected people.
 Run for martyrs who fought for Nation.

Biker's Rally 

The Kuchaman Biker's Rally is a Motorcycle rally held annually in Kuchaman City.
The event is held every year on 26 January,Republic Day.
Organised by the Kuchaman Biker's Club, the event attracts around 200 Royal Enfield motorcycle enthusiasts from Kuchaman.

Sightseeing

Kuchaman Fort 

Perched atop a  cliff, the Kuchaman Fort is the most important attraction in Kuchaman. It was built by a Gurjara-Pratihara king during 730–760. Currently a heritage hotel, the fort displays a rich collection of original inlay work in semi-precious stones, glass, and gold paint. The Sheesh Mahal (glass palace) is a sight for marvel. A colourful bazaar, located below the fort, is a great place to shop for handicrafts and fabrics.

Meera Mahal 
The Meera Mahal is a palace which plays host to the miniature paintings illustrating the life story of Rathore poet-saint Meerabai, the passionate devotee of Lord Krishna. Meera Mahal, which contains a solid display of paintings on the life of Mirabai( who was from the Rathore dynasty and she was a poet Saint). She later married a strong warrior namely Rana Sangha. The passion and dedication with which Meera (a married Rajput woman) worshiped Lord Krishna has been a part of the folklore for ages and is still considered to be one of the finest efforts by any devotee to evince the allegiance to the Lord. Ranjit Singh constructed the Mahal (Palace) and its temple, which contains lok devta and gurus.

Jal Mahal 
Jal Mahal (Water Palace) is a unique concept visualised and implemented with an aim to provide the queens and princesses with a hidden swimming pool. The fort has two swimming pools. Jal Mahal, an underground pool, is royal in every aspect with its supercilious cloisters and arcades. The fort is now a heritage hotel.

Sabha Prakash 
The Sabha Prakash (Illumination Meeting) used to be the formal chambers for meetings and for holding court to interact with citizens. Many critical decisions for welfare and dispute settlement were delivered from the main hall. The hall itself is decorated exquisitely and is adorned with polished walls strewn with semi-precious pebbles and shingles that are intricately inlaid. The decoration of the Sabha Prakash was deliberately done, keeping in mind the exhaustive exposure it would have to the public eye. The decoration shifts towards the Shekhavati style. However, most of the decoration is unique to the Kuchaman Fort.

Lok Dev and Devi Temple 
Built by Ranjit Singh, this temple showcases paintings of Lok Devtas (folk-deity) such as Sant Gogaji, Baba Ram Dev, Sant Ravi Das, and Sant Kabir.
There are many lok devi temples like Shakambhari Mata, karni Mata, Sheetala Mata.

Chini Pole (चीणी पोळ)  
Complete with intricately painted interiors, this pole was constructed by a Chinese traveler who wanted to narrate his travel experiences in a unique way.

Ganesh Dungri 

Ganesh Dungri, is a Hindu temple located in Kuchaman. The grand temple is located on an elevated at Dungari hill in Kuchaman. The temple is sometimes also referred to as the Ganesh Temple. This temple is believed to have been built during the rule of the Raja Hari Singh.

Shakambhri Hill 
Perched in the midst of the Aravali mountain range, this temple is believed to have been built during the rule of the Raja Pratap Singh. Twice a year, in the Ashwin and Chaitra months of the Hindu calendar (during the days of Navratra), the famous Shakumbhri Mela is organised. About 100 meter southeast of Shakumbari lies the Bhura Dev (BHAIRAV) temple which is considered to be the guard of Shakambhari Devi.

Gates of Old City 
 Paltan Dwar (Paltan Gate) 
 Kashmiri Daruja (Kashmiri Gate) 
 Aathuno Darujo (West Gate) 
 Hauj ko Darujo (Cistern/Pool/हौद Gate) 
 Suraj Pole gate

Gates of New City 
 Kuchaman Dwar
 Shiksha Dwar
 Valley Gate

Gallery

References

Cities and towns in Nagaur district
Tourist attractions in Nagaur district